Noida International Airport, also known as Jewar International Airport, is an upcoming international airport being constructed near Jewar in Gautam Buddha Nagar District, Uttar Pradesh in India, which will serve the  National Capital Region (NCR). Once completed, it will be an alternative to Indira Gandhi International Airport in Delhi by relieving its high and rising traffic load, and is planned to be India's largest airport. The Noida International Airport Limited (NIAL) will be the implementing agency on behalf of the Government of Uttar Pradesh. The airport is to be developed through a public-private partnership model (PPP). In 2019, Flughafen Zürich AG, the operator of Zurich Airport in Switzerland won the bid to build and operate the airport for 40 years. The National Highways Authority of India (NHAI) is also constructing a  greenfield highway from the airport to Sector-65, Faridabad on Delhi–Mumbai Expressway.

The proposed plan is to build a two-runway airport by 2024, and at a future date, to expand it into a  six-runway airport. According to the plan, the airport will handle twelve million passengers per annum (MPA) initially and up to 60–120 MPA, after its expansion over a period of 30 years. It will be the third commercial airport in the National Capital Region, after Indira Gandhi International Airport and Hindon Airport.

History
The project was first proposed in 2001 by then Uttar Pradesh Chief Minister Rajnath Singh as a greenfield Taj International Aviation Hub (TIAH) at Jewar near Greater Noida, adjacent to the Yamuna Expressway. The Central Government cleared the techno-feasibility report for setting up TIAH in April 2003. It was to be built at an approximate cost of 5000 crores by the year 2007–2008. The project was put on hold during the UPA regime because the project site was within  of an existing greenfield airport in Delhi. This site was within  of Indira Gandhi International Airport (IGI), Delhi. Its operator GMR Group had protested against plans for another international airport within  of the existing Delhi Airport, claiming that it would impact traffic and revenue generation. GMR has the right of first refusal (RoFR) on a new airport within  of the existing Delhi Airport. The RoFR was to ensure that GMR gets preference in bidding for the Greater Noida airport in case its bid price is within 10% of the lowest bidder.

When the Akhilesh Yadav-led government was formed in Uttar Pradesh in 2012, it contemplated shelving the project while proposing a new international airport in Agra. In June 2013, the State Government decided on the Kurrikupa village near Hirangaon, Tundla in the Firozabad district as the site for the proposed airport. In January 2014, the Defence Ministry raised some objections regarding the site near Tundla. The state government allocated land near Etmadpur for the proposed airport in November 2014.

In 2014, the Bharatiya Janata Party (BJP) was voted to power at the centre and the project was again shifted back to Jewar. The Union Ministry of Defence (MoD) cleared the project in June 2016. The Ministry of Civil Aviation (MoCA) gave an in-principle approval to the Uttar Pradesh government to build the airport in May 2018. In July 2017, the Union Chief Secretary for Aviation warned the Uttar Pradesh government to expedite the planning process as Hisar Airport was also pushing for its competing Union Cabinet approval for building another airport to serve the NCR region, thus prolonging the return on investment for both airports due to a still-feasible-but-diluted viability for both.

Location
Noida, Dadri, and Jewar are the three tehsils (sub-divisions) in this district. In October 2017, for the first phase of building the airport, the Yamuna Expressway Industrial Development Authority (YEIDA) acquired land in villages such as Mukimpur Siwara, Dayanat Pur, Ramner, Kishorpur, Banwari Bas, Ranhera, Rohi, and Parohi. Similarly in January 2021, YEIDA started taking possession of land for the phase-2 expansion in villages such as Ranhera, Shahpur Nangla, Birampur, Karauli Bangar, and Dayanat Pur (Jewar Tehsil).

It will be connected to the Yamuna Expressway, allowing domestic and international tourists to reach Agra, Mathura, and Vrindavan.

India's largest airport
With six runways once all its expansions are completed, it will be India's and Asia's largest airport and will be the fourth-largest airport in the world. In 2019, a proposal was made to build two additional runways to bring the total to eight runways once completed, subject to the availability of land. The proposal has been approved by Chief Minister Yogi Adityanath.

It will also be India's first net-zero carbon emissions airport. Only the Chicago–O'Hare and the Dallas/Fort Worth airports are larger, with eight and seven runways respectively. Other existing airports with six runways are Amsterdam, Boston, Denver, and Detroit. Atlanta, Houston–Intercontinental, Seoul–Incheon, Shanghai–Pudong, and Toronto–Pearson have five runways. As of February 2023, with three runways, the Indira Gandhi International Airport has the highest number of runways of any airport in India.

Connectivity

Road
The Noida International Airport (NIA) shall be connected with various highways in Delhi NCR like Ghaziabad–Bulandshahr–Aligarh (NH-34) and Delhi–Ghaziabad–Meerut Expressway.

The NHAI is also constructing a  highway which will connect Jewar Airport with Faridabad on Delhi–Mumbai Expressway. The greenfield alignment is as follows (east to west):
 Yamuna Expressway at Dayanat Pur village, Jewar
 KGP Expressway at Mohna village, Ballabhgarh 
 Delhi–Mumbai Expressway at Sector-65, Faridabad

Railway
Noida Airport is also proposed to be connected to Noida Metro via the Greater Noida route; and the Delhi Metro via the Faridabad–Ballabhgarh–Palwal–Jewar route. It is proposed to be connected with driverless pod taxis or personal rapid transit (PRT) from amusement park included in the proposed film city project, located in Greater Noida's Sector 21 to the airport. It is also proposed that the airport will have a high-speed railway (HSR) station in the proposed Delhi-Varanasi HSR corridor, included in India's High-Speed Rail project.

Construction
Construction work started in November 2021. At present, ATC, runway and terminal building work is under process.

Status updates
 2001: The project was first proposed in 2001 by the then Chief Minister of Uttar Pradesh, Rajnath Singh, as Taj International Aviation Hub (TIAH) in Jewar.
 2012: The project was shelved by the then Chief Minister of Uttar Pradesh, Akhilesh Yadav, in 2012, and he planned to build a new airport near Tundla, Firozabad District.
 Aug 2018: The company called Noida International Airport Limited (NIAL) formed. NIAL will handle the bidding and overall project management of the project.
 Nov 2018: Government of Uttar Pradesh approves the allocation of ₹ 1,260 crores for land acquisition.
 Dec 2018: The airport will be built under the Public–Private Partnership (PPP) model.
 Dec 2018: The Gautam Buddha Nagar District Administration submitted the Rehabilitation and Resettlement (R&R) document on land acquisition.
 Feb 2019: In the Uttar Pradesh budget, the Government of Uttar Pradesh has allocated  800 crores for land acquisition to expedite the process. Foundation stone for the project to be laid in March 2019.
 Mar 2019: Due to land acquisition related issues, the foundation stone laying ceremony is deferred for a few months.
The remaining land will be acquired soon, and the developer for Phase-I will be finalised by November 2019.
 Nov 2019: Contract given to Flughafen Zürich AG (Zurich Airport AG) for developing and operating the airport for 40 years.
Phase-I of the project will be completed by 2023.
The construction time of this road is 3 months.
 Oct 2020: The final agreement signed between Noida International Airport Limited (NIAL) and Zurich Airport AG, where the latter will build, operate, and manage the airport, through its special-purpose vehicle (SPV), Yamuna International Airport Private Limited (YIAPL).
 Feb 2021: The master plan for the airport is approved by the Airports Authority of India (AAI).
Jun 2021: Construction for the airport's Phase-I is expected to start by August 2021.
Jul 2021: The formal process of handing over 1,334 ha. of land for the project to NIAL on a 90-year lease was completed in the presence of the Chief Minister of Uttar Pradesh, Yogi Adityanath. A shareholder agreement was also signed between the airport developer company, Zurich Airport AG, YIAPL, and NIAL.
Aug 2021: YIAPL and Zurich Airport AG start construction work for the main terminal and the boundary wall of the airport, as of 24 August. The deadline for completion of the terminal is set for September 2024.
Sep 2021: Government of India approves the master plan for the airport.
Nov 2021: Prime Minister Narendra Modi laid the foundation stone for the airport on 25 November.
Apr 2022: Larsen & Toubro, Tata Projects Limited and Shapoorji Pallonji bid for the civil construction contract of the airport. The winning bidder will be selected on 28 April 2022. 
May 2022: Tata Projects Limited emerges as the lowest bidder for the civil construction contract for construction of the airport's terminal and other associated works, but the final contract is yet to be awarded.
Jun 2022: Tata Projects Limited was awarded the civil construction contract by NIAL. The airport will be TPL's second airport project after Allahabad Airport.
 Jul 2022: Tender for -long spur package from Sector-65 Faridabad (on Delhi-Mumbai Expressway) to Dayanat Pur near the airport's site has been awarded by the National Highways Authority of India (NHAI).
 Aug 2022: The airport will be completed and will undergo testing in March 2024, while it will become operational for traffic in October 2024.

References

External links
 Project status as on 9-April-2008
 Project status as on 8-May-2009
 Project status as on 27-Dec-2009
 Project status as on 02-Mar-2010
 Project status as on 13-Mar-2010

Airports in Uttar Pradesh
International airports in India
Proposed airports in Uttar Pradesh
Gautam Buddh Nagar district
Transport in Gautam Buddh Nagar district